The Memorial Aksakov Museum in Ufa is a writer's house biographical museum which commemorates the life and work of author Sergey Aksakov in an apartment where he lived in Ufa, Bashkortostan, Russia. It is located about two blocks from Republic House.

See also
Abramtsevo Colony

References

Buildings and structures in Ufa
Cultural heritage monuments of regional significance in Bashkortostan
Literary museums in Russia
Museums in Bashkortostan